Albert John Bakunas, Jr, a.k.a. A.J. Bakunas (October 23, 1950 – September 22, 1978) was a stunt performer who died doubling for George Kennedy in a fall from the Kincaid Towers in Lexington, Kentucky, for the film Steel (1979).

Born in Fort Lee, New Jersey, Bakunas quit his job as a gym teacher at Tenafly (N.J.) High School in 1974 and set out to break into the film industry.  He did his first stuntwork for the 1975 film Dog Day Afternoon.  Bakunas became known for expertly performing falls from great heights.

In 1978, Bakunas set a world record with a  fall from a helicopter for the film Hooper, which was broken that same year by Dar Robinson's  fall for a non-movie-related publicity stunt.

Bakunas, determined to retake the record, returned to Lexington to perform a  jump from the 22nd floor of a construction site, where he had previously successfully fallen nine stories. However, the airbag split on impact, and Bakunas died of his injuries the next day.

Filmography

References

Lexington Leader, September 21, 1978

External links

American stunt performers
1950 births
1978 deaths
Male actors from New Jersey
Accidental deaths from falls
Accidental deaths in Kentucky
Filmed deaths from falls
Filmed deaths in the United States
20th-century American male actors